Virgilio Conrero (1 January 1918 – 6 January 1990)  was an Italian automotive engineer, entrepreneur and racing team manager. He is known for tuning and racing cars from marques such as Alfa Romeo, Lancia, and Opel.

History
Conrero was born in Turin, Italy in 1918. After serving in the Regia Aeronautica as an aircraft mechanic in World War II, he established Autotecnica Conrero in 1951, and successfully tuned Alfa Romeo cars until 1969. During this time he also tuned Lancia Aurelia models. His workshops also built a small number of cars in the 1950s based on Alfa Romeo chassis, such as the Conrero Alfa Romeo that competed in the 20th Mille Miglia in 1953. After his involvement with Alfas ended, he began a cooperation with General Motors Italy, tuning and race preparing Opels. The firm is now called Studio Futuro and located in Lugo. The main client is Lotus. The company also offers sporting accessories for cars (see also Triumph Conrero). Conrero died in 1990.

References

External links
Profile at autoindex.org
Profile at VEA
Profile at memorialconrero.it (in Italian)

1918 births
1990 deaths
Automotive engineers from Turin
Italian Air Force personnel
Italian motorsport people